A picture book is a book format that combines visual and verbal narratives. 

Picture Book may also refer to:
Picture Book (TV series), a BBC TV series that first appeared in 1955
Picture Book (Simply Red album), 1985
"Picture Book" (song), a song by The Kinks
Picture Book (The Kinks album), 2008